Esmeralda Boyle (September 29, 1840 – ) was an American author and poet, best known for her book Biographical Sketches of Distinguished Marylanders (1877).

Life and career 
Esmeralda Boyle was born on September 29, 1840 in Washington, D.C., one of four daughters and five children of US Navy Commodore Junius Ignatius Boyle.  She was born at the Boyle country residence of Shamrock Hill, on the site of the present day Glenwood Cemetery.

Like her parents, Boyle was part of Washington's social elite.  Future US President James A. Garfield wrote of her in his diary after meeting her on a social occasion in 1873: "[She] is beautiful, and has published two volumes of poems, which give much promise of future achievements."

In 1874, Boyle founded the Literary Society of Washington - called merely "The Literary" in elite circles - with Olive Risley Seward and Sara Carr Upton.  The Society membership drew from the women and men of the Washington elite, including Garfield, and its first meeting was in the back parlor of Boyle's mother's home at 723 21st St NW.

Boyle wrote several volumes of poetry, some biographical works, including the first life story of Francis Scott Key, and pieces for numerous publications, including The Army and Navy Journal, The Galaxy, The Hesperian, The Overland Monthly, Out West, and The St. Louis Magazine. She also wrote a society column in the Washington Capital newspaper.

Boyle never married, but she had been engaged to John Hay.

For the last decade and a half of her life, she lived in Grand Island, Nebraska, near where some of her relations had settled.  In Nebraska, she taught French and Spanish and worked in a land office.  She died there on April 18, 1928 at the age of 87.

Bibliography 

 Thistledown 1871
 The Story of Felice 1872
 Songs of Land and Sea 1875
 The Image Breaker 1875
 Biographical Sketches of Distinguished Marylanders 1877
 Father John McElroy, the Irish Priest 1878
 Saint Cecilia's Gates 1890
Something About the Letterkins 1900

References

External links
 https://www.findagrave.com/memorial/81605012/esmeralda-boyle

Created via preloaddraft
1840 births
1928 deaths
American women novelists
Novelists from Washington, D.C.